Encrypted filesystem may refer to:

 Filesystem-level encryption, a form of disk encryption where individual files or directories are encrypted by the file system itself
 Encrypting File System, the Microsoft Windows encryption subsystem of NTFS

See also
 Disk encryption, which uses encrypts every bit of data that goes on a disk or disk volume
 Disk encryption hardware
 Disk encryption software
 Hardware-based full disk encryption